Vanoni is a surname. Notable people with the surname include:

Everton Vanoni (born 1981), Brazilian football manager
Ezio Vanoni (1903–1956), Italian economist and politician
Giovanni Antonio Vanoni (1810–1886), Swiss painter
Ornella Vanoni (born 1934), Italian singer

Italian-language surnames